Yair Arboleda Quiñónes (born 7 April 1998) is a Colombian footballer.

Career

Professional 
Arboleda began his career with Tijuana in 2014, where he scored 5 goals in 12 appearances for their reserves. He returned to Santa Fe in 2015, before having loan spells with Llaneros and Houston Dynamo in 2016. While with Houston, Arboleda appeared for their United Soccer League affiliate side Rio Grande Valley FC Toros.

References

External links

1998 births
Association football midfielders
Colombian expatriate footballers
Colombian footballers
Living people
Club Tijuana footballers
Independiente Santa Fe footballers
Llaneros F.C. players
Houston Dynamo FC players
Rio Grande Valley FC Toros players
Atlético Huila footballers
Cúcuta Deportivo footballers
Unión Comercio footballers
Categoría Primera A players
Categoría Primera B players
Major League Soccer players
USL Championship players
Expatriate soccer players in the United States
Expatriate footballers in Peru
Colombian expatriate sportspeople in the United States
Colombian expatriate sportspeople in Peru
Sportspeople from Valle del Cauca Department